Now: The Hits of Autumn 2011 was released on 1 April 2011. It is the 32nd album in the series of the Australian Now! series. It peaked at No. 4 on the ARIA Compilations Chart and No. 28 on the Top 50 End Of Year Compilation Chart.

Track listing
Wynter Gordon – "Dirty Talk" (3:16)
Bruno Mars – "Grenade" (3:39)
Katy Perry – "Firework" (3:47)
David Guetta featuring Rihanna – "Who's That Chick?" (3:19)
Flo Rida – "Turn Around (5, 4, 3, 2, 1)" (3:19)
Birds of Tokyo – "Wild at Heart" (4:01)
My Chemical Romance – "Sing" (4:03)
Good Charlotte – "Sex on the Radio" (3:16)
Duck Sauce – "Barbra Streisand" (3:13)
Zoë Badwi – "Accidents Happen" (3:05)
Tinie Tempah featuring Kelly Rowland – "Invincible" (3:20)
You Me at Six and Chiddy – "Rescue Me" (3:13)
Jason Derulo – "The Sky's the Limit" (3:42)
John Butler Trio – "I'd Do Anything" (3:05)
Michael Bublé – "Hollywood" (3:34)
Adele – "Rolling in the Deep" (3:47)
Plan B – "She Said" (3:28)
360 featuring Pez – "Just Got Started" (3:12)
Example – "Kickstarts" (3:01)
Gorillaz featuring Daley – "Doncamatic" (3:19)
Paramore – "Playing God" (3:03)
Alex Gaudino – "I'm in Love (I Wanna Do It)" (2:47)
Miami Horror – "Summersun" (4:32)

References

External links
 NOW: The Hits of Autumn 2011 @ iTunes

2011 compilation albums
Now That's What I Call Music! albums (Australian series)
EMI Records compilation albums